A Dickens fair, Dickens Christmas fair, or Dickens  festival is a weekend or multi-weekend gathering, usually held in the United States, open to the public and typically commercial in nature, which attempts to recreate a Victorian English setting reminiscent of the novels of Charles Dickens. The British equivalent, known as a Dickensian evening, is distinct from its American counterpart because it is organised by local businesses and the town council to raise money for charity. Events may be outdoor, indoor or a combination of the two. The great majority are Christmas-themed, a reflection of the enduring legacy of Dickens' 1843 novella A Christmas Carol. The fairs generally include an abundance of costumed entertainers and fair-goers, musical and theatrical acts, and art, handicrafts, food and drink for sale.

Characteristics
Dramatic and musical entertainment, artisan demonstrations, dancing, parades, and lectures or discussions on literary or historical topics may be part of the events. Costumed entertainers are likely to impersonate characters from Dickens' novels, as well as historical figures such as Queen Victoria.

History of the fairs in the United States
Ron Patterson and his wife Phyllis, started the first "Renaissance Pleasure Faire" in southern California in 1963, making it an annual event beginning in spring 1966. Five years later they initiated a fall renaissance fair event in the San Francisco Bay Area with a harvest theme. These traditions took root locally and spread across the country. They then launched the Great Dickens Christmas Fair in San Francisco, an indoor event, in 1970. This has also inspired similar events across the U.S.

Dickens fairs in England
Beginning in the 1980s, the English town of Ware began hosting a Charles Dickens themed carnival during the first week of December to welcome the arrival of Santa Claus. The 25th Dickensian Evening was held in 2019. Townspeople wear Victorian costumes, local businesses and volunteer groups run food and gift stalls to raise money for charity, actors perform a short open-air play such as A Christmas Carol, a craft fair is held in the drill hall, a nativity scene is unveiled in St Mary's church, a choir sings Christmas carols in the churchyard, puppeteers and street musicians entertain the public, and fairground rides and games are hosted in the town centre. The highlight of the evening involves the mayor turning on the Christmas lights, and leading a procession featuring costumed performers and dancers, horse drawn beer wagons from McMullen's Brewery, the town crier, carnival floats, and marching band(s). The 26th Dickensian Evening is expected to relaunch in December 2022, after being cancelled in 2020 and 2021 due to the pandemic.

The commercialised American approach was later exported back to England; a warehouse-based theme park, Dickens World, opened in Kent, England, in May 2007. It closed on 12 October 2016.

See also 
 Dickens World
 Renaissance fair
 Revels
 Neo-Victorian
 Steampunk
 Victoriana

References

External links
List of Dickens fairs (U.S.)
Edwardian Ball - a California ball inspired by the works of Edward Gorey and loosely set in the Edwardian era

Christmas in the United States
Festivals in the United States
Historical reenactment events
History festivals by period
Theatre festivals in the United States